Béatrice, Countess of Albon and Dauphine of Viennois (1161–1228) was ruling countess and dauphine in 1162–1228, in succession upon the death of her father Guigues V.

She married Hugh III, Duke of Burgundy in 1183 and had three children:

 André Guigues VI (1184–1237), Dauphin of Viennois
 Mahaut (1190–1242), married in 1214 John I, Count of Châlon and Auxonne (1190–1267)
 Marguerite (1192–1243), married c. 1217 Amadeus IV, Count of Savoy (1197–1253), Count of Savoy

References

1161 births
1228 deaths
12th-century French people
13th-century peers of France
12th-century French women
13th-century French women
12th-century women rulers
13th-century women rulers
Dauphins of Viennois
Counts of Albon
Counts of Grenoble
Counts of Oisans
Counts of Briançon
Duchesses of Burgundy